Douneika (also: Δουνέικα - Dounika) is a village and a community in the southern part of the municipal unit of Amaliada in Elis, Greece. It is situated near the Ionian Sea coast, 3 km south of Kardamas, 4 km northwest of Myrtia, 4 km west of Alpochori and 6 km south of Amaliada. The Greek National Road 9/E55 (Patras - Pyrgos) passes northeast of the village. The community consists of the villages Douneika, Agia Marina, Danika and Kato Kertezeika.

Geography

External links
https://web.archive.org/web/20040924133050/http://www.amaliada.gr/%CE%BD%CE%AD%CE%B1_%CF%83%CE%B5%CE%BB%CE%AF%CE%B4%CE%B1_10.htm (in Greek)
GTP - Douneika

See also
List of settlements in Elis

References

Populated places in Elis